Sarıyaprak is a village in the Pervari District of Siirt Province in Turkey. The village had a population of 274 in 2021.

The hamlets of Karadayı is attached to the village.

References 

Villages in Pervari District
Kurdish settlements in Siirt Province